Julor is a 2019 Ghanaian movie directed by the filmmaker Justice Ornan Abadah.

Plot
Aaron and Agnes are in an unhappy marriage. A thief breaks into their home, leading the couple to reveal their secrets.

Cast
 Jeffery Nortey
 Anthony Woode
 Sitsofe Tsikor 
 Ben Affat

References

Ghanaian comedy-drama films
2019 films
2019 comedy-drama films